Ali Aref Bourhan (born 1934 in Tadjoura, Djibouti) is a Djiboutian politician.

Early years
Bourhan was born in 1934 in the coastal city of Tadjoura, situated in eastern present-day Djibouti. He hailed from a prominent local Afar family, the Abourbakers. He also has a Gadabursi grandmother from Zeila.

As a young man in the 1950s, Bourhan began his professional career as a teacher. He also ran the town's Afar and Somali youth club.

Political career
Bourhan entered politics under the aegis of Ibrahim Sultan, the then Sultan of Tadjoura. Through the latter, he was introduced to Mahmoud Harbi, the Vice President of the Government Council of French Somaliland and a former comrade of the Sultan in the French army during the World War II campaign. Bourhan would subsequently serve in the territory's representative council as a Harbist politician, strongly supporting Harbi's independence-oriented platform. In 1958, Harbi disappeared from the local political scene, having been exiled to Cairo by the French authorities. He died in a plane crash two years later under mysterious circumstances.

In 1960, with the fall of the ruling Dini administration, Bourhan assumed the seat of Vice President of the Government Council of French Somaliland, representing the UNI party. He would hold that position until 1966. In July of the following year, he was elected President of the Government Council of the French Territory of the Afars and the Issas. Bourhan served in that capacity until July 29, 1976, the eve of Djibouti's independence. He was succeeded in office by Abdallah Mohamed Kamil.

Personal life 

He tied the knor May 15, 1971 in Carcassonne with Régine Soulé. They divorced in 1979. Ali Aref married second time on May 14, 2014 in Kempeski Palace with a young Djiboutian lady, Ms. Aref Filsane.

Children 
From his first marriage, he was blessed with a son named Karim Aref Bourhan who was born on February 7, 1979.

See also
Aussa Sultanate

Notes

References
Jacques Foccart et Ali Aref (in French)

External links
Jacques Foccart et Ali Aref (in French)

                   

Afar people
1934 births
Djiboutian independence activists
Living people